The 1999 Sparkassen Cup (tennis) was a women's tennis tournament played on indoor hard courts in Leipzig, Germany. It was part of the Tier II category of the 1999 WTA Tour. The tournament was held from 1 November 1 until 7 November 1999. Second-seeded Nathalie Tauziat won the singles title and earned $80,000 first-prize money.

Entrants

Seeds

Other entrants
The following players received wildcards into the singles main draw:
  Sabine Appelmans
  Kim Clijsters
  Sandra Klösel

The following players received wildcards into the doubles main draw:
  Julia Schruff /  Lydia Steinbach

The following players received entry from the singles qualifying draw:

  Tatiana Panova
  Květa Hrdličková
  Nadia Petrova
  Sandra Kleinová

Finals

Singles

 Nathalie Tauziat defeated  Květa Hrdličková, 6–1, 6–3
 This was Tauziat's sixth WTA title of her career, and second of the year.

Doubles

 Mary Pierce /  Larisa Neiland defeated  Elena Likhovtseva /  Ai Sugiyama, 6–4, 6–3

References

External links
 ITF tournament edition details
 Tournament draws

Sparkassen Cup
Sparkassen Cup (tennis)
German